Samuel Asante (born 13 August 1989) is a Ghanaian footballer who plays as a midfielder.

Career

College and amateur
Asante played four years of college soccer at the Lindsey Wilson College.

During his time at college, Okai also played for USL PDL clubs Des Moines Menace in 2009, and Rochester Thunder in 2010.

Professional career
Asante signed with USL Pro club Charlotte Eagles in April 2013.

References

1989 births
Living people
Ghanaian footballers
Ghanaian expatriate footballers
Des Moines Menace players
Rochester Thunder players
Charlotte Eagles players
Richmond Kickers players
Expatriate soccer players in the United States
USL League Two players
USL Championship players
Lindsey Wilson Blue Raiders men's soccer players
People from Sunyani District
Association football midfielders